Jasna Kolar-Merdan (born 19 October 1956 in Mostar) is a former Bosnian and Yugoslav  handball player who competed in the 1980 Summer Olympics, in the 1984 Summer Olympics and in the 1992 Summer Olympics.

In 1980 she won the silver medal with the Yugoslav team. She played all five matches and scored nine goals.

Four years later she won the gold medal as member of the Yugoslav team. She played all five matches and scored 48 goals. She was the top scorer of the tournament.

She was voted World Handball Player of 1990 by the International Handball Federation.

In 1992 she was part of the Austrian team which finished fifth in the Olympic tournament. She played all four matches and scored 23 goals.

External links
profile

1956 births
Living people
Yugoslav female handball players
Austrian female handball players
Handball players at the 1980 Summer Olympics
Handball players at the 1984 Summer Olympics
Handball players at the 1992 Summer Olympics
Olympic handball players of Yugoslavia
Olympic handball players of Austria
Olympic gold medalists for Yugoslavia
Olympic silver medalists for Yugoslavia
Olympic medalists in handball
Medalists at the 1984 Summer Olympics
Medalists at the 1980 Summer Olympics